SpinVox was a start-up company that is now a subsidiary of global speech technology company Nuance Communications, an American multinational computer software technology corporation, headquartered in Burlington, Massachusetts, United States on the outskirts of Boston, that provides speech and imaging applications. Initially, SpinVox provided voice-to-text conversion services for carrier markets, including wireless, fixed, VoIP and cable, as well as for unified communications, enterprise and Web 2.0 environments. This service was ostensibly provided through an automated computer system, with human intervention where needed. However, there were accusations that the system operated almost exclusively through the use of call-center workers in South Africa and the Philippines.

Company history
The company was founded in 2003 by Christina Domecq and Daniel Doulton. The company had raised $200 million in funding.  Company accounts for the company in 2007  stated that SpinVox made a loss of £36 million against £2 million of revenue.  In July 2009, in response to cash-flow problems it asked staff to take all or part of their salaries in stock to reduce costs. In August 2009, a dossier, alleging financial irregularities, was circulated to shareholders, leading to the company launching an inquiry into the activities of some senior executives. Unaudited accounts for 2008 show the group's pre-tax loss widened to £49 million compared with £37 million a year earlier 
In September 2009, Invesco Perpetual stated that it had written down the value of its investment in the company by 90% and that Spinvox was for sale. SpinVox was sold to US company Nuance Communications for $103 million (£64 million) in December 2009.

Technology
The Voice Message Conversion System (VMCS) worked by combining speech technologies with live learning capabilities and human intelligence. It was developed by the SpinVox Advanced Speech Group based in Cambridge, UK, led by Cambridge academic entrepreneur Dr. Tony Robinson and includes Cambridge University Professor Phil Woodland. The company supported the following languages: English; French, Spanish, German, Italian and Portuguese. Parent companies such as Nuance Communications have claimed that "spinvox is offering something that is impossible to deliver now"  Patent applications filed by the company in 2004 and 2008 note that "because human operators are used instead of machine transcription, voicemails are converted accurately, intelligently, appropriately and succinctly into text messages"

In 2009 SpinVox also acquired New Zealand based company Angel Messaging, in the process gaining its second patent, 'Method and System of processing messages' which clearly outlines how Human transcribers can be efficiently used in real time transcription of voice messages.

SpinVox voice-to-text conversion services included voicemail-to-text, speak-a-text, blog posts, social network updates, blast and memo messages. SpinVox also operated an open API to enable any developer to create speech-to-text based Web or mobile applications.

Data protection issues
A 2009 investigation by the BBC technology correspondent Rory Cellan-Jones alleged that the company transfers voicemail data out of the European Union to call centres in South Africa and the Philippines, in breach of its entry on the UK Register of data controllers, and that most of the transcription is done by humans rather than software. SpinVox admitted that "parts of messages can be sent to a 'conversion expert'", but also claimed that "the part sent is anonymised so that there is no way of tracking back a particular number or person".

SpinVox responded to allegations and stated that the company was in compliance with the Data Protection Act 1998. In a statement, the company said that the act permitted the processing of data outside of the EEA.

References

External links
 Official website

Telecommunications companies of the United States
Telecommunications companies of the United Kingdom
Companies based in Buckinghamshire
Marlow, Buckinghamshire